The Chesepian or Chesapeake were a  Native American tribe who inhabited the area now known as South Hampton Roads in the U.S. state of Virginia. They occupied an area which is now the Norfolk, Portsmouth, Chesapeake, and Virginia Beach areas. To their west were the members of the Nansemond tribe.

The main village of the Chesepian was called Skicoke, located in the present independent city of Norfolk. The exact location of Skicoak is unknown. It may have been near the junction of the Eastern and Southern Branches of the Elizabeth River in downtown Norfolk. Other evidence suggests it was located in the Pine Beach area of Sewell's Point. At that location, a large Native American burial mound was discovered close to the 20th-century community named Algonquin Village.

The Chesepian also had two other towns (or villages), Apasus and Chesepioc, both near the Chesapeake Bay in what is now the independent city of Virginia Beach. Of these, Chesepioc was known to have been located in the present Great Neck area. Archaeologists and other persons have found numerous Native American artifacts, such as arrowheads, stone axes, pottery and beads in Great Neck Point. Several buried remains of the indigenous people have been found in this area as well.

Although they were eastern-Algonquian-speaking, as were the thousands of members of the Powhatan Confederacy, the archaeological evidence suggests that the original Chesepian people belonged to another group, the Carolina Algonquian.

According to William Strachey's The Historie of Travaile into Virginia Britannia (1618), the Chesepian were wiped out by the Powhatan, the paramount head of the Virginia Peninsula-based Powhatan Confederacy, some time before the arrival of the English at Jamestown in 1607. The Chesepian were eliminated because Powhatan's priests had warned him that "from the Chesapeake Bay a nation should arise, which should dissolve and give end to his empire".

Though historians of the period express little doubt that the Powhatans eradicated the Chesapeake tribe, Strachey's belief that these rumored prophesies indicated the Christian God's intervention on behalf of the Jamestown Colony against "The Devil's Empire" appears, in hindsight, rather eccentric.

References

Sources
 Helen C. Rountree. The Powhatan Indians of Virginia:  Their Traditional Culture. Norman, Univ. of Oklahoma Press (1989).
 Helen C. Rountree. Pocahontas's People:  The Powhatan Indians of Virginia through Four Centuries. Norman, Univ. of Oklahoma Press (1990).
 Shi, David, E. America: A Narrative History (6th edition), (2004) W.W. Norton & Company, Inc.

Indigenous peoples of the Southeastern Woodlands
Algonquian peoples
Native American history of Virginia
Native American tribes in Virginia
Powhatan Confederacy
Algonquian ethnonyms